Infected (typeset as iNFeCTeD) were an industrial death metal band from Perth, Western Australia, which formed in 1992 with James Campbell on bass guitar, Joe Kapiteyn on vocals, Matthew Jefferson on guitar, and Gareth Morris on drums.

History
After two self-released cassettes they signed with Shock's metal label, Thrust Records. They released two albums, Crawlspace (1993) and Control (1995). After each album they toured Australia to promote the records. They supported international acts Morbid Angel, Fear Factory, Pungent Stench and Carcass on their tours in Australia. In 1996 Infected released another cassette and broke up in September.

Infected reformed in 2003 to record a new EP and again in 2008. After another shorter period of inactivity, 2009 saw the band play a Halloween show in Perth in support of a re-release of their album crawlspace through Western Australian label Prime Cuts Music.

Members
James Campbell – bass guitar
Matthew Jefferson – guitar
Joe Kapiteyn – vocals
Gareth Morris – drums
Bjorg Saetre – keyboards (1995–1996)
Robert Thorpe – keyboards (2003)
Andrew Wright – keyboards (2008)

Discography 
Albums
crawlspace (Thrust Records, December 1993)
CoNTRoL (Thrust Records, April 1995)
crawlspace (Prime Cuts Music, 2009 re-release)

EPs
winter (1992)
prick (Wild Rags, 1993)
TRiAL (1996)
straightwhitegod (Independent, 2003)

References

External links 
infected Myspace page

Australian death metal musical groups
Industrial metal musical groups
Musical groups disestablished in 1996
Musical groups established in 1992